Brantôme en Périgord (literally Brantôme in Périgord) is a commune in the Dordogne department of southwestern France. The municipality was established on 1 January 2016 by the merger of the former communes of Brantôme and Saint-Julien-de-Bourdeilles. On 1 January 2019, the former communes of Cantillac, Eyvirat, La Gonterie-Boulouneix, Saint-Crépin-de-Richemont, Sencenac-Puy-de-Fourches and Valeuil were merged into Brantôme en Périgord.

Population

See also 
Communes of the Dordogne department

References 

Communes of Dordogne